) was a literary, liberal, and socialist newspaper published in Paris, France, from 1897 to 1914. Its most famous headline was Émile Zola's J'Accuse...! leading into his article on the Dreyfus Affair.

The newspaper was published by Georges Clemenceau, who later became the Prime Minister of France. Georges Mandel as a young man worked for the paper in its early years, and later was also recruited by Clemenceau to serve as his aide in government.

External links
 Digitized issues of L'Aurore 1897 to 1916, Gallica, the digital library of the Bibliothèque nationale de France (BnF)

1897 establishments in France
1916 disestablishments in France
Defunct newspapers published in France
Dreyfus affair
Liberal media in France
Newspapers published in Paris
Publications established in 1897
Publications disestablished in 1916
Socialist newspapers